Protosphyraena is a fossil genus of swordfish-like marine fish, that thrived worldwide during the Upper Cretaceous Period (Coniacian-Maastrichtian). Though fossil remains of this taxon have been found in both Europe and Asia, it is perhaps best known from the Smoky Hill Member of the Niobrara Chalk Formation of Kansas (Late Coniacian-Early Campanian). Protosphyraena was a large fish, averaging 2–3 metres in length. Protosphyraena shared the Cretaceous oceans with aquatic reptiles, such as mosasaurs and plesiosaurs, as well as with many other species of extinct predatory fish. The name Protosphyraena is a combination of the Greek word protos ("early") plus Sphyraena, the genus name for barracuda, as paleontologists initially mistook Protosphyraena for an ancestral barracuda. Recent research shows that the genus Protosphyraena is not at all related to the true swordfish-family Xiphiidae, but belongs to the extinct family Pachycormidae.

History and taxonomy

As is the case with many fossil vertebrates discovered by 19th century paleontologists, the taxonomy of Protosphyraena has had a confusing history. Fossil pectoral spines belonging to this taxon were first recognized in 1822, from chalk deposits in England, by Gideon Mantell, the physician and geologist who also discovered the dinosaur Iguanodon. In 1857, the fish was named Protosphyraena ferox by the renowned American naturalist and paleontologist, Joseph Leidy, based on Mantell's English finds. Earlier, Leidy had published an illustration of a Protosphyraena tooth from the Cretaceous-aged Navesink Formation of New Jersey (Maastrichtian), but mistakenly identified it as having come from a dinosaur. During the 1870s, B. F. Mudge, a fossil collector supplying material to rival paleontologists Edward Drinker Cope and Othniel Charles Marsh, discovered a number of specimens of Protosphyraena in Niobrara exposures in Rooks and Ellis counties in Kansas and sent them back east. Between 1873 and 1877, Cope renamed three species based on Mudge's specimens, all of which would eventually be recognized as belonging to the genus Protosphyraena: Erisichte nitida, "Portheus" gladius, and "Pelecopterus" pernicciosus. Between 1895 and 1903, paleontologists in America and England, including Arthur Smith Woodward (1895), Loomis (1900), O. P. Hay (1903), in a series of important works, reviewed the genus, adding much to our understanding of this fish.

Today, two species of Protosphyraena are recognized from the Niobrara Chalk of the western United States: P. nitida and P. perniciosa. An additional species, P. bentonianum was named by Albin Stewart in 1898, based on a specimen from the older Lincoln Member of the Greenhorn Limestone (Upper Cenomanian). Perhaps the oldest remains of Protosphyraena in North America have come from the upper beds of the Dakota Sandstone (middle Cenomanian) in Russell County, Kansas (Everhart, 2005; p. 91).

Anatomy

In its general body plan, Protosphyraena resembled a modern sailfish, though it was smaller with a shorter rostrum, was somewhat less hydrodynamic, and adults possessed large blade-like teeth (adults of living swordfish species are toothless). Complete skeletons of Protosphyraena are relatively rare, but in parts of the Niobrara Chalk, the Mooreville Chalk Formation of Alabama, and other geological formations, fragmentary specimens are quite common and most often include isolated teeth, the distinctive rostrum, and fragments of the long saw-edged pectoral fin first described by Mantell. Usually, portions of the skull and postcranial skeleton are found separately. This preservational bias can be explained by the fact that the skeleton of Protosphyraena was less ossified than that of most bony fishes and tended to be torn apart by scavengers or decay before burial and fossilization (Everhart, 2005; p. 93). Like most of the Cretaceous marine fauna, Protosphyraena became extinct at the end of the Mesozoic; the resemblance to living swordfish apparently results from convergent evolution.

Gallery

References

Cope, E. D. 1873. On two new species of Saurodontidae. Proceedings of the Academy of Natural Sciences of Philadelphia 25:337-339.
Cope, E. D. 1874. Review of the vertebrata of the Cretaceous period found west of the Mississippi River. U. S. Geolological Survey of the Territories, Bulletin 1(2):3-48.
Cope, E. D. 1875. The Vertebrata of the Cretaceous Formations of the West. Report of the U. S. Geological Survey of the Territories. 2 (Washington, D.C.: Government Printing Office):302 pp.
Everhart, M. J. 2005. Oceans of Kansas: A Natural History of the Western Interior Sea. Indiana University Press: 323 pp.

Mantell, G. 1822. The fossils of the South Downs; or illustrations of the geology of Sussex. London: Lupton Relfe. xiv + 327 pp.

Woodward, A. S. 1895. Catalogue of the fossil fishes in the British Museum. Part 3. British Museum of Natural History, London.  pp. i-xliii, 1–544.

External links
Protosphyraena: A Late Cretaceous "Swordfish" at the Oceans of Kansas website. Includes detailed taxonomic history, life restorations, bibliography, many photos of fossil remains.
 The most complete skeleton of Protosphyraena pernicosa yet found, on display at the Rocky Mountain Dinosaur Resource Center.

Late Cretaceous fish of North America
Pachycormiformes
Marine fish genera
Prehistoric ray-finned fish genera
Cretaceous bony fish
Cretaceous fish of Europe
Coniacian genus first appearances
Maastrichtian genus extinctions
Demopolis Chalk